Ajoy Kajal Mukherjee was a former Indian association football player. He played at the 1964 AFC Asian Cup, where India national football team finished second. He also represented India at the 1966 Asian Games Football tournament. He died in the year 2006.

Honours

India
AFC Asian Cup runners-up: 1964
Merdeka Tournament runner-up: 1964; third-place: 1965, 1966

East Bengal
IFA Shield: 1970

References

Indian footballers
Footballers from Kolkata
India international footballers
1964 AFC Asian Cup players
East Bengal Club players
Mohun Bagan AC players
Mohammedan SC (Kolkata) players
Association football midfielders
Calcutta Football League players
Footballers at the 1966 Asian Games
Asian Games competitors for India
1942 births
2006 deaths